Clínica con música is a 1974 Argentine film directed by Francisco Guerrero.

Cast
 Marta Bianchi as Graciella
 Carlos Perciavalle as Edison Smith
 Antonio Gasalla as Tarzán
 Thelma Stefani as MD. Bevilacqua
 Norman Briski as Rosendo
 Adriana Aguirre

External links
 

1974 films
Argentine comedy films
1970s Spanish-language films
1970s Argentine films